The 2002 Canberra Women's Classic was a women's tennis tournament played on outdoor hard courts at the National Sports Club in Lyneham, Canberra, Australia and was part of the Tier V category of the 2002 WTA Tour. It was the second edition of the tournament and was held from 6 through 12 January 2002. Unseeded Anna Smashnova won the singles title and earned $16,000 first-prize money.

Finals

Singles

 Anna Smashnova defeated  Tamarine Tanasugarn 7–5, 7–6(7–2)
 It was Smashnova's 2nd singles title of the year and the 4th of her career.

Doubles

 Nannie de Villiers /  Irina Selyutina defeated  Samantha Reeves /  Adriana Serra Zanetti 6–2, 6–3

References

External links
 ITF tournament edition details
 Tournament draws

Canberra International
Canberra International
Canberra International